Pterolophia circulata is a species of beetle in the family Cerambycidae. It was described by Bernhard Schwarzer in 1931. It is known from Java, Borneo, Malaysia, Sumatra.

References

circulata
Beetles described in 1931